Shinvi was a South Korean girl group formed by Cid.K Entertainment, a subsidiary of SM Entertainment. The group is composed of Yoo Soo-jin, Oh Sang-eun and Yoo-na. The group only released debut album 15 to 30 in April 2002 and the members separated one year later to led the group disbanded.

History
Shinvi was promoted by SM Entertainment but was actually under a subsidiary of the company, similarly to their labelmate group Milk. Their first album was scheduled to be released in late 2001, but instead came out in April 2002. Shinhwa member Jun Jin appeared in the music video of their title song, "To My Friend". A poll was conducted on Shinvi's website to determine what the group's follow up release would be. "Darling" was voted as the next song for the group to promote, and it was also used in the online game Shining Lore. Shinvi released another solo song on the SM Entertainment compilation album Summer Vacation in SMTOWN.com, entitled "Summer in Love". The last album that the group participated in was 2002 Winter Vacation in SMTOWN.com. Though Yuna appeared in the music video for "My Angel My Light", only Soo Jin and Sang Eun were featured on the album's jacket. Since this last release there have been no updates on the status of the group, and Shinvi is assumed to have disbanded.

Members
 Yoo Soo-jin - leader, high vocal
 Oh Sang-eun - lead vocal
 Yoo-na - low vocal

Discography

Studio albums
 15 to 30, April 2002

Collaborations
 Summer Vacation In SMTown.com, June 2002
 2002 Winter Vacation in SMTOWN.com - My Angel My Light, December 2002

References

External links
 Shinvi at Billboard Korea
 Shinvi on empas people
 Shinvi on EPG
Shinvi on Hanple

K-pop music groups
South Korean girl groups
Musical groups established in 2002
Musical groups disestablished in 2002
SM Entertainment artists
2002 establishments in South Korea
2002 disestablishments in South Korea